NGC 25 is a barred lenticular galaxy situated in the Phoenix constellation. It was discovered on 28 October 1834 by John Herschel.  It is the brightest cluster galaxy for Abell cluster 2731.
A supernova was discovered in NGC 25 on 15 November 2020.

References

External links
 
 

Galaxies discovered in 1834
0024
Phoenix (constellation)
Barred lenticular galaxies
18341028